In probability theory and statistics, the skew normal distribution is a continuous probability distribution that generalises the normal distribution to allow for non-zero skewness.

Definition

Let  denote the standard normal probability density function

with the cumulative distribution function given by
,

where "erf" is the error function.  Then the probability density function (pdf) of the skew-normal distribution with parameter  is given by

This distribution was first introduced by O'Hagan and  Leonard (1976). Alternative forms to this distribution, with the corresponding quantile function, have been given by Ashour and Abdel-Hamid and by Mudholkar and Hutson.

A stochastic process that underpins the distribution was described by Andel, Netuka and Zvara (1984). Both the distribution and its stochastic process underpinnings were consequences of the symmetry argument developed in Chan and Tong (1986), which applies to multivariate cases beyond normality, e.g. skew multivariate t distribution and others.

To add location and scale parameters to this, one makes the usual transform . One can verify that the normal distribution is recovered when , and that the absolute value of the skewness increases as the absolute value of  increases. The distribution is right skewed if  and is left skewed if . The probability density function with location , scale , and parameter  becomes

Note, however, that the skewness of the distribution is limited to the interval .

As has been shown, the mode (maximum)  of the distribution is unique.

where  and

Estimation

If a closed-form expression is needed, the method of moments can be applied to estimate  from the sample skew, by inverting the skewness equation. This yields the estimate

Consequently, .

The  maximum (theoretical) skewness is obtained by setting  in the skewness equation, giving . However it is possible that the sample skewness is larger, and then  cannot be determined from these equations. When using the method of moments in an automatic fashion, for example to give starting values for maximum likelihood iteration, one should therefore let (for example) .

Concern has been expressed about the impact of skew normal methods on the reliability of inferences based upon them.

Related distributions

The exponentially modified normal distribution is another 3-parameter distribution that is a generalization of the normal distribution to skewed cases. Thus, in terms of the seven states of randomness, it shows "proper mild randomness". In the same terms, it shows "borderline mild randomness".

Thus, the skew normal is useful for modeling skewed distributions which nevertheless have no more outliers than the normal, while the exponentially modified normal is useful for cases with an increased incidence of outliers in (just) one direction.

See also

 Generalized normal distribution
 Log-normal distribution

References

External links
 The multi-variate skew-normal distribution with an application to body mass, height and Body Mass Index
 A very brief introduction to the skew-normal distribution
 The Skew-Normal Probability Distribution (and related distributions, such as the skew-t)
 OWENS: Owen's T Function 
 Closed-skew Distributions - Simulation, Inversion and Parameter Estimation

Continuous distributions
Normal distribution